Paula Ludwig (born 1900; died 1974 in Darmstadt) was an Austrian/German poet who won the 1963 George Trakl Prize. In her earlier life she had an affair with Yvan Goll, which caused a crisis for his wife Claire Goll. In 1940 she began a period of exile in Brazil due to the rise of Nazism. Her work has fallen into relative obscurity and often involved dreams.

References 

Austrian women poets
Austrian women writers
1900 births
1974 deaths
20th-century Austrian poets
20th-century women writers
Date of birth missing
Date of death missing
Austrian expatriates in Brazil